Bettina Skrzypczak (born 25 January 1963) is a Polish/Swiss composer.

Biography
Skrzypczak was born in Poznań, Poland. She studied piano at Bydgoszcz and music at the Academy of Music in Poznan. In 1985 she graduated with a degree in music theory, and in 1988 with a degree in composition, studying with Andrzej Koszewski. From 1984-88 she studied with Witold Lutoslawski, Luigi Nono, Henri Pousseur, and Iannis Xenakis in composition courses organised in Kazimierz by the Polish section of the ISCM. In 1988 she studied electronic music with Thomas Kessler and composition with Rudolf Kelterborn in Basle, Switzerland. She also studied musicology with Jürg Stenzl and complementary studies in cultural philosophy with Hans Saner in Fribourg. In 1990 she studied computer music with Klarenz Barlow in Cologne. In 1999 she received a doctorate degree from the Academy of Music in Cracow.

In 2002 Skrzypczak took a position as a professor at the Music University Lucerne. She also served as a guest lecturer at schools and universities including the International Courses of New Music in Darmstadt in 2004, the European Chamber Music Academy, Hannover, and Hochschule für Musik und Theater, Munich.

Skrzypczak founded and served as artistic director of the Swiss "Ensemble Boswil" promoting young artists with annual workshops in Boswil followed by concert tours. Her works have been performed internationally. She is the author of radio programs and journal articles on contemporary and Polish music. She resides in Riehen/Switzerland.

Honors and awards
1989 Prize, Zagreb Music Biennale's competition for young composers
1990 Prize, Tadeusz Baird Competition, Warsaw
1992 Honorable mention, "Tribune internationale des compositeurs", Paris
1994 Prize, 10th International Competition for Women Composers, Mannheim
1996 Cultural Recognition Prize, City of Basle
2001 Composition Grant, Canton and City of Lucerne
2004 Cultural Prize of the City of Riehen
2008 Composition Grant, Canton and City of Lucerne

Works
Selected works include:
ABC (1986) for tape
Acaso (1994) for choir, clarinet, cello and percussion, Text: Stéphane Mallarmé, Jorge Luis Borges, Nikolaus Kopernikus, Rainer Maria Rilke, trad. (Maori)
Amoureske (2003) for viola d'amore
Anomalia Lunae media (2007) for soprano, baritone and instruments, Text: Leonhard Euler, Boethius, Leonardo da Vinci, Jorge Luis Borges
Arcato (2000) for Viola solo
Aria (2004) for 2 bass saxophones
Caleidoscopio (1992) for string ensemble
Cercar (2001) for prepared guitar solo
Concerto for Piano and Orchestra (1998)
Concerto for Oboe and Orchestra (1995/96)
Daphnes Lied (Daphne's Song) (2002) for piano solo
Fantasie (1997) for oboe solo
Flash (2007) for percussion solo
Illuminationen (Illuminations) (2008) for clarinet, cello and piano
In un soffio (2003) for wind quintet
Initial (2005) for orchestra
Landschaft des Augenblicks (1992) Five Songs for mezzo-soprano, viola and piano, Text: Czeslaw Milosz, Kazimiera Illakowiczówna, Leopold Staff, Maria Pawlikowska-Jasnorzewska
Lettres (2004) for soprano, clarinet and cello Text: Guillaume de Machaut
Mazurka (2000) for accordion solo
Miroirs (2000) for mezzo-soprano and ensemble, Texts: J. L. Borges, Li Tai-bo, Bernart de Ventadorn und Satchal Sarmas
Mouvement (1999) for flute solo
Nonet for Wind Instruments and Double Bass (1994)
Notturno (1992) for flute solo
Phototaxis (2003) for string orchestra
Scène (2001) for violin and cello
String Quartet nr. 2 (1991)
String Quartet nr. 3 (1993)
String Quartet nr. 4 (2003)
Toccata sospesa (1999) for flute und 2 percussionists
Trio (1990) for 3 percussionists
Variabile (1991) for orchestra
Verba (1987) for orchestra
Vier Figuren (2001) for ensemble (18 players) in 3 groups
Weissagung (Prophecy) (2003) composed improvisation for the "quartet noir"
What Is Black, What Is White (1987) for 2 percussionists

References

1963 births
Living people
20th-century classical composers
Polish music educators
Women classical composers
Polish composers
Musicians from Poznań
People from Riehen
Women music educators
20th-century women composers
Polish women composers